Eric Gonzalez-Diaz (born September 5, 1986 in San Juan de la Rambla, Canary Islands) is a former professional baseball player.

He was drafted by the San Diego Padres in the 24th round of the 2008 MLB Draft out of the University of South Alabama. He had previously attended Cochise Community College in Douglas, Arizona. After playing in the Padres system through 2010 he was released and signed with the Lake Erie Crushers of the Frontier League, an independent league. He remained with independent teams for the remainder of his professional career, last playing for the Camden Riversharks of the Atlantic League and the Kansas City T-Bones of the American Association in 2013.

He played for the Spain national baseball team in the 2013 World Baseball Classic.

References

External links

1986 births
Baseball pitchers
Living people
2013 World Baseball Classic players
Arizona League Padres players
Fort Wayne TinCaps players
Lake Elsinore Storm players
Portland Beavers players
Lake Erie Crushers players
Sportspeople from Santa Cruz de Tenerife
People from Tenerife
Sportspeople from the Province of Santa Cruz de Tenerife
Camden Riversharks players
Kansas City T-Bones players
South Alabama Jaguars baseball players
Cochise Apaches baseball players